Eduardo Casey was an Argentine born of Irish parents in 1847 in Buenos Aires. In 1880 he purchased  of land in Santa Fe Province and founded there the present-day city of Venado Tuerto, named after a one-eyed deer that alerted early settlers to attacks by local Indians. He also helped in the founding and funding of the Argentine town of Pigüé, Saavedra in 1884.

He was born in Lobos, Province of Buenos Aires, the son of Lawrence Casey, born in Westmeath, and Mary O'Neill, of Wicklow. He was married to María Inés Gahan, daughter of John Gahan and Mary Devitt, belonging to a family of Irish Catholics.

References 

1847 births
1906 deaths
People from Buenos Aires
Argentine people of Irish descent